The Retreat River, a perennial stream that is part of the Lachlan catchment within the Murray–Darling basin, is located in the central western region of New South Wales, in eastern Australia.

The Retreat River rises on the western slopes of the Great Dividing Range, near Shooters Hill, and flows generally to the south-west, before reaching its confluence with the Abercrombie River, near Hadley.

The river flows adjacent to the Abercrombie River National Park, with access at The Sink campground.

See also 

 List of rivers of Australia
 List of rivers of New South Wales (L–Z)
 Rivers of New South Wales

References 

Rivers of New South Wales
Murray-Darling basin
Central West (New South Wales)